The Telangana High Court is the High Court for the Indian state of Telangana. Founded by the 7th Nizam Mir Osman Ali Khan, initially, it was set up as High Court of Hyderabad for the then Princely State of Hyderabad Deccan and later renamed High Court of Andhra Pradesh, as it was set up on 5 November 1956 under the States Reorganisation Act, 1956.The Andhra Pradesh High Court was renamed as High Court of Judicature at Hyderabad in view of the bifurcation of Andhra Pradesh state.

The President of India, on 26 December 2018, issued orders bifurcating The High Court of Judicature at Hyderabad for the State of Telangana and the State of Andhra Pradesh into High Court of Andhra Pradesh with the principal seat at Amaravati and High Court for the State of Telangana with the principal seat at Hyderabad. The bifurcation and the constitution of separate High Courts for Telangana and Andhra Pradesh came into effect from 1 January 2019.

From 2 June 2014, after the Andhra Pradesh Reorganisation Act, 2014 came into force, it was renamed and served as a common high court for both of the states until 1 January 2019. A separate high court was established for Andhra Pradesh and inaugurated on 1 January 2019 and it was named as Andhra Pradesh High Court.

The seat of the high court is in Hyderabad and has been sanctioned for 42 judges.

History of the judiciary 
The State of Andhra Pradesh was formed in 1956 by the separation of the merger of the Andhra State which was formed in the year 1953 from erstwhile Madras state and the Telangana area of Hyderabad Deccan which was acceded by Government of India on 17 September 1948 after the Nizam's rule. On 1 January 2019, Telangana High Court was bifurcated into Andhra Pradesh High Court and Telangana High Court after the formation of the state of Telangana.

History of High Court building 

The High Court stands on the south bank of the River Musi. This is one of the finest buildings in the city, built in red and white stones in Saracenic style, by Nizam VII Mir Osman Ali Khan the ruler of the princely state of Hyderabad.

The plan of the High Court was drawn up by Shankar Lal of Jaipur and the local engineer who executed the design was Mehar Ali Fazil.  Its chief engineer was Nawab Khan Bahadur Mirza Akbar Baig. The construction started on 15 April 1915 and was completed on 31 March 1919. On 20 April 1920 the High Court building was inaugurated by the seventh Nizam Mir Osman Ali Khan.

While digging the foundation for the High Court, ruins of the Qutb Shahi Palaces, namely Hina Mahal and Nadi Mahal were unearthed. The High Court looks beautiful and impressive from the Naya Pul Bridge at sunset.

After its construction, a silver model of the High Court with a silver key was presented to the Nizam VII Mir Osman Ali Khan by the Judiciary during the Silver Jubilee Celebrations in 1936. The facsimile of the buildings was perfectly carved in a thick sheet of silver weighing about 300 kg. The model is now in the Nizam's Museum in Purani Haveli.

The main building of the High Court was constructed in the year 1919 by the then Nizam's Government accommodating six judges besides accommodation for the office staff, record rooms and Advocates' Hall.

After the formation of Andhra Pradesh 
When the High Court of Andhra Pradesh was formed in 1956 as a consequence of States Reorganisation Act, the number of judges was increased to 12. The existing accommodation was inadequate to meet the requirements of the larger High Court and so the additional building was constructed in 1958–59. The entire office rooms, record rooms, chambers of advocates (42 in all) and the rooms for law officers were located in this building. The record rooms, Officer rooms in the main building were modified to provide chambers and Court Hall accommodation for 14 Judges.

Construction of Annexe 

By 1970, the institution of cases of the High Court has gone up to 35,000 as against 20,000 in 1958. The number of judges increased from 14 to 32. To provide additional accommodation for Judges, Staff and Advocates and Law Officers, the third building was proposed and the work was completed in 1976. The Law Officers strength was increased from 8 to 18 by 1980 and the institution of cases had gone up to 55,593 cases. In 1979 a plan was drawn for the four-storey Annexe building and due to lack of funds that could not be taken up. There are currently 32 Court Halls and 38 Chambers located in the High Court main building and Annexe buildings. The present building for which the foundation stone is being laid by the Honourable Chief Justice will have eight Court Halls and eight Chamber for the Judges. Some of the Court Halls located in the Verandahs and in the office rooms will be restored to their original position. The institution of cases had risen from 20,078 from 1958 to 1982, 123 including miscellaneous cases in 1985. Now the pendency of cases in High Court as on 24 July 1987 are 84,855 (i.e., 66,276 main cases + 18,579 miscellaneous cases). The Government of India is contemplating to raise the strength of the Judges of this High Court to 36 and in such case, more funds have to be released for the construction of Annexe buildings. After the completion of this building, the main building and Annexes buildings can locate 32 Court Halls and 38 Chambers.

2009 Major fire 

On 31 August 2009 a major accidental fire broke out through the building reportedly causing severe damage to the library housing rare England law reports, Privy Council journals and a life-size portrait of the Nizam and portraits of judges. However, the records of the court are reportedly safe. The structural integrity of the building also may have been compromised.

The Judges 
The Telangana High Court sits at Hyderabad and has jurisdiction over the state of Telangana. It may have a maximum of 42 Judges of which 32 may be permanently appointed and 10 may be additionally appointed. Currently, it has 32 judges.

Permanent judges

Additional judges

Chief Justices

Present Registrars of High Court 
 Registrar General- K. Sujana
 Registrar (Judicial I)- G.V.Subramaniam
Registrar (Judicial II)-K Gangadhara rao
 Registrar (Administration) - K.Sujana
 Registrar (I.T.)-cum-Central Project Coordinator (IT & E-Committee related)- D. Ramakanth
 Registrar (Vigilance) - K.Sai Rama Devi
 Registrar (Management)-V Ramesh
 Registrar (Protocol)-T Venkateswara Rao
 District Judge (Enquiries)
 Registrar (Recruitment)

Present Unit Heads 
  Adilabad  - M. R. Sunitha
  Karimnagar - G.Bhavani Chandra
  Khammam  - P Chandrashekara Prasad
  Mahabubnagar -S Premavathi
  Medak -  B Papi Reddy
  Nalgonda - S Jagjeevan Kumar
  Nizamabad -Kunchala Suneetha
  Rangareddy  - R Tirupathi
  Warangal - Nandikonda Narsing Rao
  Hyderabad-City Civil Court - Renuka Yara
  Hyderabad-City Small Causes Court -V B Nirmala Geethamba
  Hyderabad-Metropolitan Sessions Court - E Tirumala Devi
  Hyderabad- Principal CBI - B R Madhusudhan Rao

See also 
 High Courts of India
 :Category:Establishments in Hyderabad State

References

External links 

 Official website
 Judicial District Units of Telangana

Heritage structures in Hyderabad, India
Organisations based in Hyderabad, India
Government of Telangana
1954 establishments in India
Establishments in Hyderabad State